Events from the year 1622 in Sweden

Incumbents
 Monarch – Gustaf II Adolf

Births

 15 October - Magnus Gabriel De la Gardie, statesman and military  (died 1686) 
 8 November - Charles X Gustav of Sweden, monarch  (died 1660) 
 Elizabeth Carlsdotter Gyllenhielm, courtier and illegitimate royal   (died 1682)

Deaths

 25 January - Charles Philip, Duke of Södermanland, prince  (died 1601) 
 Jesper Mattson Cruus af Edeby, soldier and politician  (died 1576)

References

 
Years of the 17th century in Sweden
Sweden